The Puducherry– Bhubaneswar Superfast Express is a Superfast train belonging to East Coast Railway zone that runs between Puducherry and Bhubaneswar in India. It is currently being operated with 22907/22908 train numbers on a weekly basis.

Service

The 12897/Puducherry–Bhubaneswar SF Express has an average speed of 59 km/hr and covers 1426 km in 24h. The 12898/Bhubaneswar–Puducherry SF Express has an average speed of 57 km/hr and covers 1426 km in 25h 15m.

Schedule

Route and halts 

The important halts of the train are:

Coach composite

The train has LHB coach with max speed of 130 kmph. Being a Superfast train, its speed limit is 110 kmph The train consists of 22 coaches:

 1 AC II Tier
 4 AC III Tier
 12 Sleeper coaches
 1 Pantry car
 2 General Unreserved
 2 Generator Cars cum Guard Cars in both ends

Traction

Both trains are hauled by a Visakhapatnam Electric Loco Shed-based WAP-7 electric locomotives from end to end in both directions.

Rake sharing 

The train shares its rake with 18495/18496 Rameswaram–Bhubaneswar Express.

Direction reversal

Train reverses its direction 1 times:

Notes

See also 

 Puducherry railway station
 Bhubaneswar railway station
 Rameswaram–Bhubaneswar Express

References

External links 

 12897/Puducherry–Bhubaneswar SF Express
 12898/Bhubaneswar–Puducherry SF Express

Transport in Puducherry
Transport in Bhubaneswar
Express trains in India
Rail transport in Puducherry
Rail transport in Andhra Pradesh
Rail transport in Tamil Nadu
Rail transport in Odisha
Railway services introduced in 2007